Kamil Karaš (born 1 March 1991) is a Slovak football midfielder who plays for 1. FC Tatran Prešov, in the 2. Liga.

Career statistics

External links
 
 MFK Košice profile

1991 births
Living people
People from Stará Ľubovňa
Sportspeople from the Prešov Region
Association football midfielders
Slovak footballers
Slovakia youth international footballers
FC VSS Košice players
FC Košice (2018) players
FK Železiarne Podbrezová players
FC ViOn Zlaté Moravce players
Slovak Super Liga players
SK Sigma Olomouc players
FC Lokomotíva Košice players
1. FC Tatran Prešov players
Slovak expatriate sportspeople in the Czech Republic
Expatriate footballers in the Czech Republic
2. Liga (Slovakia) players
3. Liga (Slovakia) players